General Pharmaceuticals Limited is a pharmaceutical company based in Dhaka, Bangladesh since 1987.

History 
General Pharmaceuticals Ltd. (GPL) was incorporated as a private limited company on 5 April 1984. Dr. Momenul Haq was the Managing Director, and Dr. Gazi Nurun Nabi was Director. The company began manufacturing drugs in 1987, initially with seven products. There are currently nearly 3000 employees, including around 2000 sales and marketing staff. The national distribution network has around 600 distribution workers.

Production facilities 

In 2011 the company extended their manufacturing facility,  from Dhaka in Gazipur.

The site has a total area of 29,792 square metres, and a building footprint of 14,444 square metres.

Exports 
The company sells its products in Bangladesh and exporting to both developed and developing countries. They export with products registered in the following countries:
Asia: Afghanistan, Bhutan, Cambodia, Sri Lanka, Myanmar, Hong Kong, Macau, Vietnam, Maldives, Philippines
Africa: Kenya, Somalia, Mauritius, Nigeria, Burkina Faso, Libya
Central and South America: Belize, Guatemala

GPL is also aiming to export to other countries of South East Asia, the Middle East, and Africa.

References

Manufacturing companies based in Dhaka
Pharmaceutical companies of Bangladesh
Pharmaceutical companies established in 1984
Bangladeshi brands